Rodrigo Javier Migone (born 6 June 1996) is an Argentine professional footballer who plays as a forward for Deportivo Madryn.

Career
Migone joined Rosario Central's youth system in 2008. He was promoted into the club's first-team squad in 2014, making two appearances in matches against Olimpo and Racing Club in November 2014. He subsequently made eight more appearances in the following three seasons. On 6 August 2017, Migone joined fellow Argentine Primera División side Patronato on loan. He made his debut on 22 September during a victory over Atlético Tucumán.

Career statistics
.

References

External links

1996 births
Living people
People from Rosario Department
Argentine footballers
Association football forwards
Argentine Primera División players
Torneo Federal A players
Rosario Central footballers
Club Atlético Patronato footballers
Boca Unidos footballers
Deportivo Madryn players
Sportspeople from Santa Fe Province